This is a list of characters from the investigative show Bitag.

Bitag Strike Force

Factions

Rogues Gallery

See also
 Bitag

Bitag characters